Gulubhai Jasdanwalla was a Hindustani Classical vocalist of the Jaipur-Atrauli Gharana and one of the foremost disciples of Gharana founder Utd. Alladiya Khan.

Background
From a entrepreneurial family, Gulubhai Jasdanwalla was a race horse breeder and a collector of Raags and compositions signature of the Jaipur-Atrauli Gharana. He was a successful importer-exporter in Mumbai.

Musical career
Utd. Manji Khan taught him the  Jaipur-Atrauli Gayaki until his death in 1937, at which point his father Utd. Alladiya Khan continued. Because of his financial success, Gulubhai Jasdanwalla was able to dedicate ample time for music and became a skilled musician. Gulubhai Jasdanwalla produced many successful disciples, including Smt. Shruti Sadolikar, and his foremost being Pt. Ratnakar Pai. Recordings of Gulubhai Jasdanwalla's private performances have been kept by friends and colleagues.

Discography
Samarpan: Tribute to Jaipur-Atrauli Gharana

References

Year of birth missing
1937 deaths
Hindustani singers
People from Tonk district
20th-century Indian singers
Singers from British India